Bekabad may refer to:
 Bek-Abad, a village in Jalal-Abad Province, Kyrgyzstan
 Bekabad, a town in Tashkent Region, Uzbekistan
 Bekobod, Namangan, a village in Yangikurgan District, Namangan Region, Uzbekistan